Worlds Apart is a 2015 Greek drama film directed by Christoforos Papakaliatis. It consists of three separate narratives, each following a love story between a foreigner and a Greek. Each story represents a different generation falling in love during a time of socioeconomic turmoil that dominates Southern Europe as a whole, only to connect as a single story in the end.

Cast
 J. K. Simmons as Sebastian
 Christoforos Papakaliatis as Giorgos
 Andrea Osvárt as Elise
 Maria Kavoyianni as Maria
 Minas Hatzisavvas as Antonis
 Tawfeek Barhom as Farris
 Niki Vakali as Daphne
 Odysseas Papaspiliopoulos as Odysseas
 Nikos Chatzopoulos as Ilias
 Matthaios Korovesis as Anthony, Giorgos' son

Reception

Worlds Apart grossed $4.8 million at the Greek box office, making it the highest grossing 2015 film in Greece.

On Rotten Tomatoes the film has an approval rating of 67% based on 9 reviews. On Metacritic, it has a score of 61 based on 5 critics, indicating "generally favourable reviews".

Frank Scheck of The Hollywood Reporter wrote: "Worlds Apart doesn’t manage to transcend the forced and familiar-feeling aspects of its multipart narrative, but it does offer an evocative portrait of its troubled milieu, and one of its segments, at least, has genuine emotional resonance."
Owen Gleiberman of Variety wrote: "It isn't bad, but it’s kind of a trifle. Though it treats its themes with reasonable honesty, it can't help but come off as a bit diagrammed."

References

External links
 
 

2015 drama films
2015 films
2010s Greek-language films
Greek drama films
Films shot in Athens